Unofficial South American Championships in Athletics were held in Rio de Janeiro, Brazil in 1922.  They were part of the "Jogos Olímpicos Latino-Americanos" held in celebration of the 100th anniversary of Brazilian independence under the patronage of the IOC.

Medal summary
Medal winners are published.

Men

* =  race void as Chilean athletes refused to re-run after false start by winner whilst two other runners infringed lane; original result 1  22.8, 2 , 3 

** = race void as crowd infringed on track; original result 1  3:31.2u, 2 , 3

Medal table (unofficial)

References

External links
gbrathletics.com

U 1922
1922 in Brazilian sport
1922 in athletics (track and field)
International athletics competitions hosted by Brazil
1922 in South American sport
International sports competitions in Rio de Janeiro (city)
Athletics in Rio de Janeiro (city)